The 2019 FIS Cross-Country Balkan Cup was a season of the FIS Cross-Country Balkan Cup, a Continental Cup season in cross-country skiing for men and women. The season began on 12 January 2019 in Ravna Gora, Croatia and concluded on 1–3 March 2019 in Gerede, Turkey.

Calendar

Men

Women

Overall standings

Men's overall standings

Women's overall standings

References

External links
2019 Overall Standings Men
2019 Overall Standings Women

FIS Cross-Country Balkan Cup
FIS Cross-Country Balkan Cup seasons
2019 in cross-country skiing